Vitali Petrovich Meshkov (born 18 February 1983) is a Russian professional football referee.

He has been a FIFA referee since 2012.

References

External links 
 
 

1983 births
Living people
Russian football referees